(born 26 September 1926) is a Japanese former ski jumper who competed in the early 1950s. He finished 42nd in the individual large hill event at the 1952 Winter Olympics in Oslo. He was born in Otaru.

External links
Olympic ski jumping results: 1948-60
 

1926 births
Possibly living people
Ski jumpers at the 1952 Winter Olympics
Japanese male ski jumpers
Olympic ski jumpers of Japan